Minuscule 132 (in the Gregory-Aland numbering), ε 208 (Soden), is a Greek minuscule manuscript of the New Testament, on parchment leaves. Palaeographically it has been assigned to the 12th century. It has complex contents and full marginalia.

Description 

The codex contains the text of the four Gospels on 289 parchment leaves (size ). The text is written in one column per page, 20 lines per page (size of text 12.9 by 9.8 cm). The ink is brown-black, the capital letters in red.

There is also another division according to the smaller Ammonian Sections (in Mark 233 sections, the last section in 16:8), with references to the Eusebian Canons.

The lectionary markings (for liturgical use) and incipits were added by a later hand.
The Synaxarion and Menologion were added by a later hand.

Text 

The Greek text of the codex is a representative of the Byzantine text-type. Hermann von Soden classified it to the textual family Kx. Aland placed it in Category V.

According to the Claremont Profile Method it belongs to the textual cluster 127 in Luke 1, Luke 10, and Luke 20.

History 

The manuscript was slightly examined by Andreas Birch (about 1782). C. R. Gregory saw it in 1886.

It is currently housed at the Vatican Library (Vat. gr. 361), at Rome.

See also 
 List of New Testament minuscules
 Biblical manuscript
 Textual criticism

References

Further reading 

 

Greek New Testament minuscules
12th-century biblical manuscripts
Manuscripts of the Vatican Library